The 2005 Bulldogs RLFC season was the 71st season in the club's history. They competed in the NRL's 2005 Telstra Premiership, finishing the regular season 12th.

Squad movement

Gains

Debuts
"Debut" means players who have not played in an elite Australian or European league competition previously.

Daniel Conn
Trent Cutler
Filinga Filiga
Dallas McIlwain
Brad Morrin
Nate Myles
Cameron Phelps
Charlie Tonga

Losses

Left club/did not play
Glen Hughes
Adrian Rainey
Trevor Thurling

Ladder

Regular season

Player statistics

Source:

Notes
 Age = Age at the end of 2005
 App = Starting appearances
 Int = Interchange appearances
 T = Tries
 G = Goals
 FG = Field Goals
 Pts = Points

Representatives
The following players have played a representative match in 2005.

References

See also
 List of Canterbury-Bankstown Bulldogs seasons

Canterbury-Bankstown Bulldogs seasons
Canterbury-Bankstown Bulldogs season